The Koblenz Open is a professional tennis tournament played on indoor hard courts. It is currently part of the ATP Challenger Tour. It is held annually in Koblenz, Germany since 2017.

Past finals

Singles

Doubles

References

External links
 Official website

 
ATP Challenger Tour
Hard court tennis tournaments
Tennis tournaments in Germany
Sport in Koblenz
Recurring sporting events established in 2017